Audrey Campbell Moore (December 28, 1928 – December 12, 2018) was an American politician from Fairfax County, Virginia. She served for twenty years on the Fairfax County Board of Supervisors, including one term as chairwoman.

Moore won the position after defeating Republican Jack Herrity for reelection in 1987. She represented the Annandale district on the board.

References

1928 births
2018 deaths
People from Fairfax County, Virginia
Members of the Fairfax County Board of Supervisors
Virginia Democrats
People from Annandale, Virginia
Women in Virginia politics
20th-century American politicians
20th-century American women politicians
University of New Hampshire alumni
Neurological disease deaths in the United States
Deaths from Alzheimer's disease
21st-century American women